Edna Mae Sheen (1944 – January 20, 2012) was an American make-up artist who credits includes Philadelphia and Courage Under Fire working directly for star Denzel Washington. She also worked on television, notably for Family Matters. Sheen was amongst the nominees for the Primetime Emmy for her work on Lackawanna Blues.

References

External links 

1944 births
2012 deaths
American make-up artists